Kildare's is an Irish Pub-themed casual dining restaurant chain and drinking establishment in the United States.  It was named after County Kildare, located in Ireland, and it specializes in Irish American cuisine.

History 
Kildare's pub was established in 2003  The interior of the West Chester location was designed by The Irish Pub Company.  The first of the locations opened in West Chester, Pennsylvania, on Gay Street in May 2003. 

The pub has been featured in various business publications such as Smart Business Philadelphia and Philadelphia Business Journal.

Atmosphere
The West Chester location was designed and built in order to replicate Old Ireland by the Irish Pub Company, a pub concept designer based in Dublin, Ireland.  The interior was built in Ireland and then shipped to the United States.

See also
 List of Irish themed restaurants

References

Economy of the Eastern United States
Irish-American cuisine
Irish restaurants
Regional restaurant chains in the United States
Restaurants established in 2003
Irish-American culture in Philadelphia
Irish-American culture in Pennsylvania
2003 establishments in Pennsylvania